Júlio César da Silva Gurjol (born 3 March 1956) is a Brazilian former footballer who played as a forward. He competed in the men's tournament at the 1976 Summer Olympics. As a player, he received the nickname "Uri Geller" for his dribbling ability.

Career 
César started his career in 1975 playing for Flamengo. He made his debut in 1975 Brazilian Serie A, where Flamengo lost the match against Recife with the score of 1-2. In 1976 he transferred to America Football Club, but returned to Flamengo later that year. He stayed in Flamengo until 1977, then switched to Remo, remaining there until 1978. In 1979 he returned to Flamengo. In 1981 he went to live in Argentina, where he played for Talleres de Córdoba. In Talleres he only played 27 games and scored 7 goals, before leaving the club due to financial problems of the institution. Then he went on to River Plate on trial, but was only able to play half a game in a summer tournament. In 1983 he returned to Brazil to play for Fortaleza and then to Vasco da Gama until 1984. In the following year he arrived at Grêmio and played there until 1986. At last he finished his career at Athletico Paranaense and retired in 1989.

References

External links
 

1956 births
Living people
Footballers from Rio de Janeiro (city)
Brazilian footballers
Association football forwards
Brazil international footballers
Olympic footballers of Brazil
Footballers at the 1976 Summer Olympics
CR Flamengo footballers
America Football Club (Rio de Janeiro) players
Clube do Remo players
Talleres de Córdoba footballers
Fortaleza Esporte Clube players
CR Vasco da Gama players
Grêmio Foot-Ball Porto Alegrense players
Club Atlético River Plate footballers